Dorcadion hellmanni is a species of beetle in the family Cerambycidae. It was described by Ludwig Ganglbauer in 1884. It is known from Iran and Turkey.

References

hellmanni
Beetles described in 1884